Caret is an unincorporated community in Essex County, in the U.S. state of Virginia.

Blandfield was listed on the National Register of Historic Places in 1969.

References

Unincorporated communities in Virginia
Unincorporated communities in Essex County, Virginia